Gyál  is a town in Pest county, Budapest metropolitan area, Hungary. It has a population of 22,552. In 1949 it had only 4,104 inhabitants. During the socialist era, Gyál become a garden suburb of Budapest.

Twin towns – sister cities

Gyál is twinned with:
 Chibed, Romania

References

External links

 in Hungarian
Street map 

Populated places in Pest County